Rupert Gibb (25 August 1900 – 4 July 1978) was  a former Australian rules footballer who played with Richmond and Footscray in the Victorian Football League (VFL).

Gibb was a well-performed professional sprinter, having won the Warrnambool Gift and the 1925 Warracknabeal Gift. Gibb was a finalist in the 1926 Stawell Gift, finishing 5th off 8 1/4yds.

In 1937, Gibb was appointed as coach of Corowa Football Club in the Ovens and Murray Football League.

Notes

Sources

External links 

R Gibb's Player Profile @ Tigerland Archive

1900 births
1978 deaths
Australian rules footballers from Victoria (Australia)
Richmond Football Club players
Footscray Football Club (VFA) players
Western Bulldogs players